The Harcourt Group is a stratigraphic group of siliciclastic rocks deposited in the Gondwanan Margin, cropping out in the Avalon Zone of Newfoundland.

References 

Geologic groups of North America
Geologic formations of Canada
Cambrian System of North America
Ordovician System of North America